Grande Rock is the third album released by the Swedish rock band The Hellacopters. Due to the departure of original guitarist Dregen, pianist Anders Lindström stepped in to record guitars under the pseudonym Boba Lee Fett. The record was released both on CD and on vinyl, the vinyl version was available in seven different colors depending on which country it was sold in. The Japanese release also contains the bonus tracks "Only Got The Shakes" and "Keepin' On". The Shock CD version contains "Makes It Alright", "Heart of the Matter" and "Holiday Cramp" as bonus tracks as well as two music videos on an additional CD-ROM.

Track listing

Personnel

The Hellacopters
Nicke Andersson – vocals, guitars
Kenny Håkansson – bass
Anders Lindström – guitars, piano
Robert Eriksson – drums

Additional
Matt McHellburger – harp, vocals
Pike McWalleye – vocals, acoustic guitar 
Zquaty – percussion
Odd De Cologne – voice 

Production
Stefan Boman – Mixing, editing
Åsa Winzell – Mastering
Anders Lind – Recording engineer

Artwork
Ray Hill – Pinstriping
Lance hammond – Photography

References

External links 
 

1999 albums
The Hellacopters albums